Yefim Alekseyevich Cherepanov (1774 – 1842), and his son Miron Yefimovich Cherepanov (1803 – 1849) were Russian inventors and industrial engineers. They were serfs of the Demidovs – a famous family of factory owners. In 1810s, Yefim built a progressive machine-building plant, equipped with a full range of innovative metal-cutting lathes (such as screw-cutters, gear-cutting serrating machines and others). From 1822 until his death, Yefim was chief mechanic for all the factories in the town of Nizhny Tagil. Miron was his apprentice and in 1819 was appointed his deputy. Miron became chief mechanic after his father's death.

Innovations

Industrial machinery
The Cherepanovs significantly improved the machinery that had been used in blast-furnace and gold-mining industries, iron and copper works, sawmills, and flourmills.

Steam engines
The most interesting aspect of the Cherepanovs' work were steam engines which they tried to introduce into industrial production. From 1820, the Cherepanovs built about 20 steam engines that ranged from 2 to 60 hp.

Railroad

In 1833-34 they built the first Russian steam locomotive. They also built a cast-iron railroad from one of their factories to a copper mine. Track gauge was 5 ft 6 in (1670 mm). In 1835, they built a second locomotive that they sent to Saint Petersburg. Despite the successful performance and operation of their locomotives, the Cherepanovs' invention found no support outside the factory and, subsequently, horse traction replaced their steam locomotives.

See also
 Russian Railway Museum, Saint Petersburg
 Stephenson's Rocket
 Planet (locomotive)
 Bury Bar Frame locomotive

References

Inventors from the Russian Empire
Locomotive builders and designers
Russian serfs
2-2-0 locomotives
Steam locomotives of the Russian Empire
1774 births
1842 deaths
1803 births
1849 deaths